The olive barb (Systomus sarana) is a species of cyprinid fish native to Afghanistan, India, Nepal, Bangladesh, Pakistan, Bhutan, Sri Lanka, Thailand and Myanmar. This species can reach a length of  TL. It is of minor importance to local commercial fisheries and sought as a gamefish. It is popular in Bangladesh but unpopular in the aquarium trade.
Adults occur in rivers, streams, lakes and backwaters. Tolerant of salinity. They form schools in groups of four or five to several dozens (Ref. 6028). Feed on aquatic insects, fish, algae and shrimps. Spawn in running waters among submerged boulders and vegetation (Ref. 4832). Small fish have limited demand in the aquarium trade.

Adults occur in rivers, streams, lakes and backwaters. Tolerant of salinity. They form schools in groups of four or five to several dozens (Ref. 6028). Feed on aquatic insects, fish, algae and shrimps. Spawn in running waters among submerged boulders and vegetation (Ref. 4832). Small fish have limited demand in the aquarium trade.

References

Systomus
Fish described in 1822